Piazza IV Novembre is a square in the storic center of Perugia.

The asymmetrical square opens up to the convergence of the five road axes that structure the medieval city and for its scenography it has represented in every era the privileged place of urban functions: here the ancient forum was located and there are preserved monuments connected to the system urban planning of the Etruscan-Roman city.

References 

Piazzas in Umbria